Mikhail Ivanovich Mikhin (1923-2007) was a Soviet MiG-15 pilot who became a flying ace during the Korean War, credited with nine to twelve victories. He was awarded the title Hero of the Soviet Union.

See also 
List of Korean War flying aces

References

Sources

External links
Interview with Mikhin

Russian aviators
Soviet Korean War flying aces
Soviet military personnel of the Korean War
Heroes of the Soviet Union
Soviet Air Force officers
1923 births
2007 deaths
Recipients of the Order of the Red Banner
Soviet major generals
Burials at Serafimovskoe Cemetery